Especially among growers in the US, the UK, and Australia, there has been a competition since the 1990s to grow the hottest chili pepper. Chili pepper species and cultivars registering over 1,000,000 Scoville Heat units (SHU) are called "super-hots". Past Guinness World Record holders (in increasing order of hotness) include the ghost pepper, Infinity chili, Trinidad Moruga scorpion, Naga Viper pepper, and Trinidad Scorpion Butch T. The current record holder, declared in 2017, is the Carolina Reaper, at more than 1.6 million SHU.

History 
Before the early 1990s, there were only two peppers which had been measured above 350,000 SHU, the Scotch bonnet and the habanero. California farmer Frank Garcia used a sport of a habanero to develop a new cultivar, the Red Savina (C. chinense), which was measured at 570,000 in 1994. At the time, this was considered representative of an upper limit of chili pepper hotness.

In 2001, Paul Bosland, a researcher at the Chile Pepper Institute at New Mexico State University, visited India to collect specimens of ghost pepper, also called the Bhut Jolokia or Naga king chili, traditionally grown near Assam, India, which was being studied by the Indian army for weaponization. When Bosland grew and tested the pepper, he discovered it measured over 1 million SHU. According to Bosland, this "kind of opened the floodgates".  In 2006, the Dorset Naga (a subspecies of the Naga Morich) was claimed to be the hottest.  In 2012, the Chili Pepper Institute called the Trinidad Moruga scorpion the new hottest pepper, saying it had been measured at 2 million SHU, the first time the 2-million mark had been reached.

Many of the cultivars developed in the attempt to produce ever-hotter peppers are hybrids of chilies traditionally grown in India and Trinidad.

Super-hots 
The new peppers have been termed "super-hots". Super-hots are classified as peppers registering over 1 million SHU.

In 2015, Bosland and his team, using fluorescence microscopy, found that while most peppers store capsaicin primarily in their pith, super-hot varieties tend to store as much in their flesh as they do in their pith. While for most peppers removing the pith and seeds also removes much of the heat, for super-hots this is not true. Super-hots not only have more capsaicin than other peppers, but also store their capsaicin differently. In their report, Bosland et al call it a  "novel discovery that these 'super-hot' chili peppers have developed accessorial vesicles on the pericarp tissue in addition to the vesicles on the placental tissue, thus leading to exceedingly high Scoville heat units for these plants."

The theoretical upper limit of super-hots is 16 million SHU, the level of pure capsaicin, but super-hots are likely to top out lower than this, as in any possible fruit, the capsaicin would be diluted by other plant tissues. In 2016, Bosland hypothesized a 3 or 4 million SHU pepper. Super-hots should be handled with gloves and using eye protection, as contact with even a single seed can cause skin irritation via chili burn.

Competition and certification 
Chili growers compete with one another "ruthlessly" to create the world's hottest pepper. According to Marc Fennell, creator of the podcast It Burns, the competition "is a hugely controversial war – there are scandals, accusations of cheating, death threats." According to Maxim, the race has "ignited heated debate" among chiliheads (or chileheads) and raised "deep questions about science, ethics, and honor." While competition takes place mainly among UK, Australian, and US growers, the competition in the US is noted for "negativity and fighting."

The "crowning achievement" is being listed in Guinness World Records. Guinness has been criticized by Trinidad Moruga scorpion creator Jim Duffy for "bestowing the title on insufficiently authenticated fruits", and the company has not named a new hottest pepper since recognizing the Carolina Reaper in 2017, despite the entry of at least two contenders. Duffy argued in 2011, when Guinness named the Naga Viper the world's hottest pepper, that the hybrid of three peppers (Naga Morich, Trinidad Scorpion and ghost pepper) could not have been developed within the time frame, as a three-way hybrid would require 10 years or longer to create.

Impact 
According to Bosland, the records are "mainly of interest as publicity for purveyors of sauces". As of 2013, hot sauce production and sales were among the fastest growing industries in the US, worth an estimated US$1 billion, and producers "sell more sauce with a world-famous chile on the label". Being able to claim the record can "make or break a new product". The developer of the Naga Viper pepper, which claimed the record for a short period in 2011, earned US$40,000 in one month from sales of seeds and sauces. The developer of the Trinidad Moruga scorpion, which claimed the record in 2012, made US$10,000 in two days selling seeds.

Seed sales are also an important revenue stream for developers. As of 2013, super-hot seeds were unavailable from commercial seed suppliers, so those wishing to grow the peppers could obtain them only from the developers or small specialty suppliers. According to Dave DeWitt, in 2013 "a typical Scorpion pepper pod at a farmers’ market [would] go for one dollar", speculating that "behind marijuana, they have the potential to become the second- or third-highest yielding crop per acre monetarily". A bottle of hot sauce claimed to have 16 million SHU sold for US$595. Chiliheads make YouTube videos showing themselves eating super-hots as a means of providing entertainment or marketing the heat of a particular pepper.

In Nagaland, India, the annual Hornbill Festival includes a ghost pepper-eating competition.

Hottest peppers

Super-hot record holders
Between 2007 and 2012, Guinness "fielded 25 different claims to world's hottest". As of 2019, Guinness lists the Carolina Reaper as the hottest pepper.

Contenders

References 

Chili peppers
Guinness World Records